Henry Augustus Ellis (24 July 1861 – 3 October 1939) was an Irish Australian physician and federalist, important in the promotion of federation in Western Australia.

Ellis, was the fourth son of Colonel Francis Ellis of County Tyrone, Ireland, and his wife Louisa, née McMahon. He was educated at St Columba's, county Tyrone and Trinity College, Dublin, where he graduated M.B. in 1884, and Ch.B. in 1885. Ellis then migrated to Australia, was a resident at Sydney hospital for two years, and from 1890 to 1894 was an honorary physician and surgeon to the hospital. He went to Coolgardie in 1894 and had charge of the government sanatorium there, took an intense interest in his work, in which he was most successful, and also interested himself in local politics and the federation movement. Western Australia did not take part in the referendum held in 1898, and the government under Forrest was opposed to the proposals for federation as late as the end of 1899.

However, on the Western Australian goldfields, the public sentiment was strongly in favour of federation, and on 13 December 1899 a meeting of delegates was held which decided to send a petition to the Queen praying for the establishment of a separate goldfields colony, which would become part of the Australian Commonwealth. Some 28,000 signatures were obtained to this petition and an immense amount of propaganda matter, mostly drafted by Ellis, was sent to the British press and members of the House of Commons. As a result, Chamberlain intimated to Forrest that if the electors of Western Australia were not given an opportunity of voting on the question of federation, the Imperial parliament would be compelled to consider seriously the request of the people of the goldfields. Parliament was called together, a referendum bill was passed, and eventually there was a large majority in favour of federation. In 1904 Ellis was elected to the Western Australian parliament but only served until 1905, when he left the Labor Party to run unsuccessfully as an independent. He returned to medical practice in Coolgardie after leaving politics, and in 1912 served as a Municipality of Coolgardie councillor. Ellis married Kassie Gordon Wylie on 4 April 1914 and they went to England.

Ellis was by now aged 52 years and was making a fresh start. During the war years he was tuberculosis officer in Middlesbrough, and in 1919 came to London as assistant physician at the Margaret-street hospital for diseases of the chest. Later he established a consultant practice in Harley Street which was successful. Part of this arose from his sympathetic understanding of the action of the mind on the body. He published in 1923 How shall I be saved from Consumption, and two short treatises followed, Reaction in Relation to Disease (1924), and An Explanation of Hydrogen Concentration (1925). He died after a long illness at Crowborough, East Sussex, on 3 October 1939 and was survived by his second wife.

References

G. C. Bolton, 'Ellis, Henry Augustus (1861 - 1939)', Australian Dictionary of Biography, Volume 8, MUP, 1981, pp 433–434. Retrieved on 12 October 2008

1861 births
1939 deaths
Australian surgeons
Australian federationists
Irish emigrants to colonial Australia
People from County Tyrone
Members of the Western Australian Legislative Assembly